Meike Evers (born 6 June 1977 in Berlin) is a German rower who was co-winner of two Olympic gold medals. She is currently a police detective and member of the "Athlete Committee" of the World Anti-Doping Agency.

References

External links
 

1977 births
Living people
Rowers from Berlin
German female rowers
Rowers at the 1996 Summer Olympics
Rowers at the 2000 Summer Olympics
Rowers at the 2004 Summer Olympics
Olympic rowers of Germany
Olympic gold medalists for Germany
Olympic medalists in rowing
Medalists at the 2000 Summer Olympics
Medalists at the 2004 Summer Olympics
World Anti-Doping Agency members
World Rowing Championships medalists for Germany
21st-century German women
20th-century German women